Claire Bennett may refer to:

 Claire Bennet, a fictional character in TV series Heroes
 Claire-Louise Bennett, British writer
 Claire Bennett, a fictional character in Cake (2014 film)